The Macau Open is a squash tournament held in Macau, China in October. It is part of the PSA World Tour and the WSA World Tour.

Past Results

Men's

Women's

References

External links
- 2011 Macau Open Squashsite page
- 2008 Macau Open Squashsite page
- PSA Macau Open 2012
- 2001 Macau Open Squashtalk page

Squash tournaments in Macau